HR 7703 (Gliese 783, 279 G. Sagittarii) is a binary star system in the constellation of Sagittarius. The brighter component has an apparent visual magnitude of 5.31, which means it is visible from suburban skies at night. The two stars are separated by an angle of 7.10″, which corresponds to an estimated semimajor axis of 56.30 AU for their orbit.

It is approaching the Solar System at a velocity of approximately 129 kilometers per second. At this rate, it will make its closest approach in 41,100 years when it comes to within  of the Sun.

This star system has been examined for an excess of radiation in the infrared. The presence of an infrared excess can be taken as an indication of a debris disk orbiting the star. However, no such excess was discovered around HR 7703. Radial velocity data collected over a period of 12 years was examined for signs of periodicity caused by a planet orbiting at a distance of 3–6 AU, but none was detected. A slight linear trend in the radial velocities of the primary is probably due to the companion star.

References

External links
Indus and Pavo
 

Sagittarius (constellation)
Binary stars
0783
K-type main-sequence stars
M-type main-sequence stars
Gliese, 0783
7703
Durchmusterung objects
Sagittarii, 279
191408
099461